Roger Boyd Holt (born April 8, 1956) is an American former college and professional baseball player who was a second baseman in Major League Baseball (MLB) during a single season in .

Holt was born in Daytona Beach, Florida.

Holt attended the University of Florida, where he played for the Florida Gators baseball team from 1975 to 1977.  He was an All-Southeastern Conference (SEC) selection and a Sporting News second-team All-American as a short stop in 1977.  Memorably, he stole three bases in a single game against Ole Miss in the 1977 SEC Tournament.  He graduated from the University of Florida with a bachelor's degree in business administration in 1983.

The New York Yankees selected Holt in the fourth round of the 1977 Major League Baseball Draft.  He played second base in two career games in October 1980.  He had one hit in six at bats and a walk.

See also 

 Florida Gators
 List of Florida Gators baseball players
 List of University of Florida alumni

References

External links 

1956 births
Living people
Baseball players from Florida
Florida Gators baseball players
Major League Baseball second basemen
New York Yankees players
Anchorage Glacier Pilots players
Columbus Clippers players
Denver Bears players
Fort Lauderdale Yankees players
West Haven Yankees players
Wichita Aeros players